Muchan (also Romanized as Mūchān and Moochan; also known as Mūchū) is a village in Qarah Kahriz Rural District, Qarah Kahriz District, Shazand County, Markazi Province, Iran. At the 2006 census, its population was 735, in 218 families.

References 

Populated places in Shazand County